The Best Footballer in Asia 2020, recognizing the best male footballer in Asia in 2020, is the 8th edition of the Best Footballer in Asia, presented by Titan Sports. Son Heung-min won the award on 4 January 2021. It was his 4rd Best Footballer in Asia title in a row, and the 5th in the previous 6 years. The event was judged by a panel of 51 sports journalists. Son Heung-min received 45 1st-place votes and 4 2nd-place votes. With 35% of all points awarded, Son achieved the highest tally of Best Footballer in Asia in history at the time.

Voting
51 judges were invited to vote, including 37 representatives from AFC nations/regions which comprise Afghanistan, Australia, Bahrain, Bangladesh, Cambodia, China, Chinese Taipei, Hong Kong, India, Indonesia, Iran, Iraq, Japan, Jordan, Korea Republic, Kuwait, Kyrgyzstan, Lebanon, Macao, Malaysia, Maldives, Myanmar, Oman, Pakistan, Palestine, Philippines, Qatar, Saudi Arabia, Singapore, Syria, Tajikistan, Thailand, Turkmenistan, United Arabic Emirates, Uzbekistan, Vietnam and Yemen. The other fourteen jurors were independent Asian football experts or from well-known football media outlets. Before voting, all judges were given a 24-player shortlist, but could choose other eligible players.

Rules 
Each juror selects 5 best footballers and awards them 6, 4, 3, 2 and 1 point respectively from their first choice to the fifth choice. A trophy for the Best Footballer in Asia is awarded to the player with the highest total of points.

Tiebreakers
When two or more candidates obtain the same points, the rankings of the concerned candidates would be based upon the following criteria in order: 

a) The number of 1st-place vote obtained

b) The number of 2nd-place vote obtained

c) The number of 3rd-place vote obtained

d) The number of 4th-place vote obtained

If all conditions are equal, the concerned candidates tie. 

If the concerned candidates are tied for first place, the award and the trophy are shared.

Ranking
Source:

References 

2020
2020 awards
2020 in Asian football